"Wrong Number" is a song by American country singer George Jones.  Jones composed the song with Dickie Overby.  It was released as a promotional single in 1965 and rose to #14 on the Billboard country chart.  The song tells the story of a man who, filled with despair, calls his former lover on the telephone because he wants to hear her voice again.  However, he dares not speak:  "I bite my lip till the blood runs free and keep the words 'I love you' hidden deep, deep inside of me..."  The woman assumes it is a wrong number and hangs up.  Although not a major hit, "Wrong Number" is another in a long list of obscure George Jones songs that he sings, as Nick Tosches put it in the Texas Monthly in 1994, "as if his soul were on fire."

1964 songs
Songs written by George Jones
Song recordings produced by Pappy Daily
United Artists Records singles
George Jones songs
Calls